Ogwashi Ukwu, sometimes spelt as Ogwashi-Uku, is an Igbo town in Delta State, Nigeria.  Located west of the state capital Asaba, and is the headquarters for the Local Government Area, Aniocha South. The population of Ogwashi-Ukwu is about 50,234.. However, its number has increased vastly and keeps increasing. It is one of the Anioma region of Delta State which is home to the Igbo-speaking people of Delta State. Its natives are the Enuani people, who are predominantly farmers and fishers. The villages in Ogwashi-Ukwu include Ikelike (the original inhabitants), Umu Dei, Azungwu, Agidiase, Agidiehe, Ogbe Akwu, Ishekpe, Ogbe Onicha, Ogbe Ubu, Ogbe Ani and Umu-okwe.

Landmarks
Jay Jay Okocha Stadium
Ogwashi-Ukwu Post Office,
Ukwu Orji at Ogbeofu,
Ihu Ngwu at Azungwu
Abu Ano Market at Ishekpe and
Ogwashi-Ukwu Carnival (Ineh Festival)
Kwale junction
Agidiase
Hausa Quarters - It had beautiful well-kept lawns and gardens maintained by prisoners under the watch of warders. There were many fruit trees: mango, guava, tangerine, orange and grapefruit which delighted the children and provided shade. Today Ogige is the site of Local Government Offices and it would benefit from landscaping and maintenance services. Although the fruit trees are gone it remains a green and leafy part of the town.
 Obi's Palace (the king's palace) at Ogbe Nti Quarters, Umu Dei Village
 Obasanjo Egg and Poultry Farm.

Institutions
Delta State Polytechnic
 Nshiagu College.
Comprehensive College
 Adaigbo College
 St.Roses Girls' Secondary  School
St Mary's Hospital, P.O. Box 38, a hospital of the Roman Catholic Diocese of Issele-Uku
Delta State Polytechnic Ogwashi-uku
Institute of Continuing Education Isah road Ogwashi-uku

Notable indigenes of Ogwashi Ukwu 
Ogwashi-Ukwu has a number of prominent people either born in the town or elsewhere, who have contributed to the growth of the town or of Nigeria. They have made their mark in the fields of politics, scholarship, sports and the arts. Here are some of them:

 Ngozi Okonjo-Iweala, is a Nigerian-American economist and international development, expert. She sits on the boards of Standard Chartered Bank, Twitter, Global Alliance for Vaccines and Immunization, and the African Risk Capacity. On 15 February 2021, she was appointed as Director-General of the World Trade Organization
 Peter Konyegwachie, champion boxer  and silver medalist, featherweight category in the 1984 Summer Olympics
 Augustine Okocha, former international professional football player
Peter Emelieze is a Nigerian-born German sprinter who specializes in the 100 metres, an African Junior Silver medalist and participant at the London 2012 Summer Olympics.

Gallery

See also
Anioma people
Organisation for the Advancement of Anioma Culture (OFAAC)
Enuani dialect
Ekumeku Movement

References

External links
Ogwashi-Uku Association USA
Delta State Polytechnic Ogwashi-Uku educational portal

Populated places in Delta State